Anolis bombiceps, the surprise anole or blue-lipped forest anole, is a species of lizard in the family Dactyloidae. The species is found in Peru, Colombia, Brazil, and Ecuador.

References

Anoles
Reptiles described in 1875
Taxa named by Edward Drinker Cope